Tauese Tuailemafua Pita Fiti Sunia (August 29, 1941 – March 26, 2003) was an American Samoan politician who served as the fifth governor of American Samoa from 1997 until his death in 2003. He was the second governor of American Samoa to die in office; Warren Terhune was the first.

Career
Sunia was a member of the Democratic Party. He won the election of 1996 in a close runoff with Lealaifuaneva Peter Reid (51%-48%). The runoff was caused by a split in the Democratic Party in American Samoa between Sunia and incumbent governor Lutali Aifili Paulo Lauvao, who received third place, with no candidate gaining a majority. Sunia won another close victory against Reid in the 2000 election, 50%–48%, with no runoff.

During Sunia's term of office a protest was issued against Samoa, formerly named Western Samoa, for changing its official name to the shorter form. The official view in American Samoa is that such a form detracts from the Samoan identity of American Samoa, and public officials and documents from American Samoa still refer to Samoa as "Western Samoa".

Personal life 
Sunia married Fagaoalii Satele Sunia in 1969. They moved back to American Samoa in 1981 after living in Hawaii and settled in Leone, American Samoa.

Death 
Sunia died during his second term, on March 26, 2003, while on a flight to Hawaii to receive medical treatment, becoming only the second governor of American Samoa (after Warren Terhune), and the first civilian one, to die in office. In 2012, the Utulei Convention Center was remodeled and renamed for Sunia. His wife, Fagaoalii Satele Sunia, died on September 5, 2015.

References

External links
Obituary
Office of Insular Affairs obituary

|-

|-

1941 births
2003 deaths
20th-century American politicians
American people of Samoan descent
American Samoa Democrats
American Samoan Congregationalists
Democratic Party governors of American Samoa
Governors of American Samoa
Lieutenant Governors of American Samoa
People from Pago Pago